At the 2009 Jeux de la Francophonie, the table tennis events were hosted at the club facilities of Homenetmen Beirut from 28 September to 4 October. A total of 54 competitors, 28 men and 26 women, took part in four different tournaments: a men's individual competition, a women's individual competition, a mixed doubles competition, and a team tournament.

Medallists

Medal table

Participation
Key: Country (no. of athletes)

 (2)
 (2)
 (2)
 (2)
 (2)
 (2)
 (2)
 (2)
 (2)
 (2)
 (2)
 (2)
 (1)
 (2)
 (2) (host)
 (2)
 (2)
 (2)
 (2)
 (1)
 (2)
 (2)
 (2)
 (2)
 (2)
 (2)
 (2)
 French Community of Belgium (2)

References
General
Livre des résultats. Jeux de la Francophonie (2009). Retrieved on 2009-10-09.
Specific

External links
Official results

Sport in Lebanon
2009 Jeux de la Francophonie
Table tennis at the Jeux de la Francophonie
2009 in table tennis